Hessengau is an historical region of modern-day Germany located between Beverungen  and Marburg in the north and Bad Hersfeld to the south.

References

Historical regions in Germany